Gunnar is a male first name of Nordic origin (Gunnarr in Old Norse). The name Gunnar means fighter, soldier, and attacker, but mostly is referred to by the Viking saying which means Brave and Bold warrior (gunnr "war" and arr "warrior"). King Gunnar was a prominent king of medieval literature such as the Middle High German epic poem, the Nibelungenlied, where King Gunnar and Queen Brynhildr hold their court at Worms. Gunder is a nordic variant, Günther is the modern German variant, and Gonario is the Italian version. Some people with the name Gunnar include:

Gunnar Andersen 
Gunnar Andersen (1890–1968), Norwegian football player and ski jumper
Gunnar Andersen (1909–1988), Norwegian ski jumper
Gunnar Aagaard Andersen (1919–1982), Danish sculptor, painter and designer
Gunnar Reiss-Andersen (1896–1964), Norwegian poet

Gunnar Andersson 
Johan Gunnar Andersson (1874–1960), Swedish archaeologist, paleontologist and geologist
Gunnar Andersson (1890–1946), Swedish trade unionist
Gunnar Andersson (Spökis; 1923–1974), Swedish aviator
Gunnar Andersson (footballer) (1928–1969), Swedish football player
Per-Gunnar Andersson
Per-Gunnar Andersson (born 1957), Swedish racing driver
Per-Gunnar Andersson (born 1980), Swedish rally driver

Others 
Gunnar Asplund (1885–1940), Swedish architect
Gunnar Bärlund (1911–1982), Finnish boxer
Gunnar Berg
Gunnar Berg (1863–1893), Norwegian painter
Gunnar Berg (1897–1987), American scouting official
Gunnar Berg (1909–1989), Swiss-Danish composer
Gunnar Berg (1923–2007), Norwegian politician
Gunnar Andreas Berg (born 1954), Norwegian musician
Gunnar Berge (born 1940), Norwegian politician
Gunnar Berggren (1908–1983), Swedish boxer
Gunnar Birkerts (1925–2017), Latvian-American architect
Gunnar Bjurner (1882–1964), Swedish Navy vice admiral
Gunnar Björnstrand (1909–1986), Swedish actor
Gunnar Ekelöf (1907–1968), Swedish poet and writer
Gunnar Eklund (1920–2010), Swedish Army lieutenant general
Gunnar Fant (1919–2009), Swedish phonetician
Gunnar Fischer (1910–2011), Swedish cinematographer
Gunnar Friedemann (1909–1943), Estonian chess player
Gunnar Garbo (1924–2016), Norwegian journalist, politician and diplomat
Gunnar Graps (1951–2004), Estonian musician
Gunnar Emil Garfors (1900–1979), Norwegian poet
Gunnar Gehl (born 2001), American singer-songwriter
Gunnar Gren (1920–1991), Swedish football player
Gunnar Hámundarson (10th century), Icelandic chieftain
Gunnar Hansen (disambiguation)
Gunnar Hansen (born 1947), Icelandic-American actor
Gunnar Hansen (boxer) (1916–2004), Norwegian boxer
Gunnar Heinsohn (born 1943), German anthropologist
Gunnar Hoppe (1914–2005), Swedish Quaternary geologist and geographer
Gunnar Höckert (1910–1940), Finnish runner
Gunnar Jarring (1907–2002), Swedish diplomat and turkologist
Gunnar Jeannette (born 1982), American racing driver
Gunnar Jedeur-Palmgren (1899–1996), Swedish Navy vice admiral
Gunnar Johansen (1906–1991), Danish-American pianist and composer
Gunnar Johansson
Gunnar Johansson (1911–1998), Swedish psychologist
Gunnar Johansson (1919–1998), Swedish canoeist
Gunnar Johansson (1924–2003), Swedish football player
Gunnar Kaasen (1882–1960), Norwegian-American dog musher
Gunnar Kangro (1913–1975), Estonian mathematician
Gunnar Klettenberg (born 1967), Estonian equestrian
Gunnar Knudsen (1848–1928), Norwegian politician
Gunnar Korhonen (1918–2001), Norwegian politician 
Gunnar Berg Lampe (1892–1978), Norwegian businessman
Gunnar Larsson
Gunnar Larsson (1908–1996), Swedish politician
Gunnar Larsson (born 1951), Swedish swimmer
Gunnar Larsson (born 1944), Swedish cross-country skier
Gunnar Larsen (1900–1958), Norwegian journalist, writer, and translator
Gunnar Larsen (politician) (1902–1973), Danish engineer, businessman and politician
Gunnar Malmquist (1893–1982), Swedish astronomer
Pål Gunnar Mikkelsplass (born 1961), Norwegian cross country skier
Gunnar Möller (1928–2017), German actor
Gunnar Molton (born 1993), drummer for Texas Hippie Coalition
Gunnar Myrdal (1898–1987), Swedish economist
Gunnar Nelson (born 1967), American musician
Gunnar Nelson (born 1988), Icelandic martial arts fighter
Gunnar Nielsen
Gunnar Nielsen (1919–2009), Swedish film actor
Gunnar Nielsen (1928–1985), Danish runner
Gunnar Guillermo Nielsen (born 1983), Faroese-Argentine football player
Gunnar Nielsen (born 1986), Faroese football player
Gunnar Nilson (1872–1951), Swedish physician
Gunnar Nilsson
Gunnar Nilsson (1922–1997), Swedish trade unionist
Gunnar Nilsson (1923–2005), Swedish boxer
Gunnar Nilsson (1948–1978), Swedish racing driver
Gunnar Nordahl (1921–1995), Swedish football player
Gunnar Nordström (1881–1923), Finnish physicist
Gunnar Öquist (born 1941), Swedish biologist
Gunnar Persson (1933–2018), Swedish cartoonist
Gunnar Randers (1914–1992), Norwegian physicist
Gunnar Rohrbacher (born 1968), American author
Gunnar Seidenfaden (1908–2001), Danish diplomat and botanist
Ole Gunnar Solskjær (born 1973), Norwegian football player
Gunnar Staalesen (born 1947), Norwegian writer
Gunnar Stålsett (born 1935), Norwegian theologician and politician
Gunnar Taucher (1886–1941), Finnish architect
Gunnar Thoresen (footballer) (1920–2017), Norwegian football player
Gunnar Thoresen (bobsledder) (1921–1972), Norwegian bobsledder
Gunnar Heiðar Þorvaldsson (born 1982), Icelandic football player
Gunnar Uusi (1931–1981), Estonian chess player
Gunnar Widforss (1879–1934), Swedish-American painter
Gunnar Wiklund (1935–1989), Swedish singer

See also
A variant name for Gunther, a semi-legendary king of the Burgundians
The Gunnar Cup is the championship trophy for the United States bandy championship.
Gunnar Optiks, an eyewear company
Gunna, Scotland, a Scottish island thought to have been named after someone called Gunnar or Gunni.
Gunner (disambiguation)

 Gunārs
 Gunar

References

Scandinavian masculine given names
Faroese masculine given names
Icelandic masculine given names
Norwegian masculine given names
Swedish masculine given names
Estonian masculine given names
English masculine given names